Douglas Neilson (born 17 December 1948) is a South African cricketer. He played in 87 first-class and 25 List A matches between 1968 and 1981.

See also
 International cricket in South Africa from 1971 to 1981

References

External links
 

1948 births
Living people
South African cricketers
Gauteng cricketers
Place of birth missing (living people)